Cédric Steinmyller (born 14 May 1990), better known by his stage name Klingande (literally: chiming), is a French DJ and tropical house producer with a prominent use of the piano and the saxophone. Klingande was originally a duo, until 2014, consisting of Steinmyller and fellow Frenchman Edgar Catry (born 1990).

Background

Name origin 
The stage name, as well as some of Klingande's songs, are in Swedish because of Steinmyller's admiration of the language. According to him, it sounds like it is being sung when it is just being spoken. With this in mind, the name was founded after a search in a Swedish dictionary. Klingande is the present participle of the Swedish verb , which means '(to) chime' or '(to) sound'. The artist name thus means 'chiming' or 'sounding'. Klingande is also inspired by Steinmyller's admiration for Swedish artists such as Avicii and Swedish House Mafia.

Musical style 
Steinmyller describes his music as "melodic house".

Career

2012: Formation
Formed in December 2012, Klingande was originally a duo consisting of Steinmyller and fellow Frenchman Edgar Catry (born 1990). When they were 10 years old, Catry and Steinmyller met at the Cross School, in northern France. Steinmyller was more interested in the teaching of music theory before he distinguishing himself as a DJ whereas Catry was more interested in piano, which he studied for more than four years. Steinmyller had moved to London to study at Point Blank Music College for a year. After returning from London to his hometown, Steinmyller had spent time with Catry before discovering their same admiration for deep house producers such as Bakermat and Nico Push. Klingande was soon formed.

2013: "Punga" and "Jubel" 
Klingande self-released their debut single, "Punga", which gained attention and eventually made it to the French Singles Chart, peaking at number 86; the song also peaked at number 62 in Austria, number 59 in Germany and number 41 in Switzerland. They found international chart success with their follow-up single "Jubel" which was released on 1 January 2013. The song peaked at number 5 on the French Singles Chart and at number one in Austria, Belgium, Germany, Italy, Switzerland and Poland. The song was also a top five hit in Australia, France, Finland, Norway, Sweden and the United Kingdom and a top 10 hit in Denmark and the Netherlands.

2014: Klingande goes solo 
In 2014, they released a remix of Clean Bandit's "Extraordinary". Edgar Catry left the group shortly after, prompting Steinmyller to continue using the stage name, as a solo act.

2015–present: "Riva", "Losing U" and "Somewhere New" 
On 2 March 2015, Steinmyller released his first single as a solo act, titled "Riva (Restart the Game)" featuring French singer Broken Back. It was released via Klingande Music with exclusive license to Ultra Records. An official music video was uploaded by Ultra Records' YouTube channel on 19 March 2015. The song charted in several countries including France, Austria, Australia, Belgium, Germany, Italy, Norway and Switzerland. It was also certified gold by FIMI.

In 2016, he released two singles: "Losing U" featuring Daylight, and "Somewhere New" featuring M-22 and uncredited vocals from English recording artist Jodie Connor. An official music video for "Losing U" was uploaded by Ultra Records on 11 March 2016.

Klingande's 2017 single "Pumped Up", featuring uncredited vocals from Lauren "LYON" Malyon, went on to chart in four countries. (The song is a reinterpretation of "Pumped Up Kicks" by Foster the People.)

Klingande released the single "Ready for Love" with UK singer-songwriter Joe Killington and featuring French harmonica player, Greg Zlap, on 26 April 2019 via Ultra Music.

Discography

Albums

Singles

Notes

Awards and nominations

References

External links 
 
 

Living people
French DJs
French electronic musicians
1991 births
Tropical house musicians
Deep house musicians
Electronic dance music DJs